John Myrth McKechenneay (25 September 1903 – 21 October 1979) was a Canadian sprinter. He competed in the men's 200 metres at the 1924 Summer Olympics.

References

External links
 

1903 births
1979 deaths
Athletes (track and field) at the 1924 Summer Olympics
Canadian male sprinters
Olympic track and field athletes of Canada
Athletes from Montreal
Anglophone Quebec people